James (Jim) P. Eisenstein is the Frank J. Roshek Professor of Physics and Applied Physics at the physics department of California Institute of Technology.

Academic career

Eisenstein received a doctoral degree from the University of California, Berkeley. Since 1983 he had been member of staff at Bell Laboratories in Murray Hill, New Jersey, until in 1996 he moved to take up a professorial post at California Institute of Technology.

He has served on NRC committees and panels such as the Solid State Sciences Committee or the DCMP Executive Committee.
He was an associate editor of the Annual Review of Condensed Matter Physics from 2014 to  2017.

Research

Eisenstein is recognised as a leader in experimental studies of low-dimensional systems in high magnetic field, low temperature set-ups. One of his seminal achievements is the first experimental realisation of the ν=5/2 fractional quantum Hall state: this is the only known quantum hall state labelled by an even denominator quantum number and it is believed in the condensed matter physics community that this state shows exotic non-abelian quantum statistics and other topological features. The ν=5/2 fractional quantum hall state is widely cited as a candidate for topological quantum computing.

Awards

Eisenstein has received many accolades of the condensed matter physics community. He is a member of the United States National Academy of Sciences, and a fellow of the American Physical Society. He is also a recipient the 2007 Oliver E. Buckley Condensed Matter Prize "for fundamental experimental and theoretical research on correlated many-electron states in low dimensional systems."

Publications

References

External links
Caltech faculty page
Oliver Buckley Prize page
 Array of Contemporary American Physicists

21st-century American physicists
Members of the United States National Academy of Sciences
Fellows of the American Academy of Arts and Sciences
California Institute of Technology faculty
Living people
Scientists at Bell Labs
Scientists from St. Louis
Physicists from Missouri
Scientists from Missouri
University of California, Berkeley alumni
1952 births
Oliver E. Buckley Condensed Matter Prize winners
Fellows of the American Physical Society